Takara Co., Ltd. (株式会社タカラ) was a Japanese toy company founded in 1955. In March 2006, the company merged with Tomy Co., Ltd. to form Takara Tomy. The Takara motto was 遊びは文化」("playing is culture").

Products

Toys
In 1967, Takara produced the first generation of the Licca-chan doll, which was 21 centimeters tall and had the last name of Kayama, inspired by the musician Yuzo Kayama and actress Yoshiko Kayama.

In 1975, Takara produced the Diaclone and Microman Micro Change toys. In 1984, the toy line was rebranded by Hasbro as "Transformers", which made Takara waste no time joining in. Takara continued to sell Microman and used it as the basis for the Micronauts toy line. Micronauts were sold internationally by the Mego Corporation. Other transforming toys made by Takara include Brave, Dennō Bōkenki Webdiver, and Daigunder. Both Webdiver and Daigunder toys could interact with TV screens, which proved only but a fad in the early 2000s.

Takara also invented Battle Beasts, the E-kara karaoke microphone, B-Daman and Beyblade. These toys were sold or distributed internationally by Hasbro. In 1978, Takara developed the Choro-Q, mini pullback cars. Internationally, they have been sold as "Penny Racers".

Software

Takara developed and published video games. In the 1990s, Takara published the Chibi Maruko-chan video games. The company ported (adapted) some of the SNK Neo Geo based arcade games for 8 and 16-bit consoles. These included the Fatal Fury and the Samurai Shodown series. They were sold for use with the Sega Genesis, the Super Nintendo Entertainment System, the Game Boy, or the Famicom.

In 2003, Takara contributed to the production of the game, Seek-and-Destroy. Takara published the 3D computer graphics fighting game series Battle Arena Toshinden, developed by Tamsoft. Small games developers such as Tamsoft, BHE, E-game and KID corp, were sometimes omitted from the credits on a game's Takara packaging or title screens. Also that year, Takara purchased a controlling stake in the publicly traded software publisher Atlus. Some Takara properties were licensed to and published by Atlus.

In 2006, after the merger with Tomy, the controlling stake in Atlus was sold to Index Holdings, Takara Tomy's major shareholder. Takara-branded product licenses such as Licca-chan, Jinsei Game, The Game of Life and Choro-Q were returned to Takara Tomy's consumer software division. The merged company also produced the Zoids and the Naruto series.

Life entertainment products
Takara has manufactured several unusual gadgets marketed as "life entertainment products". An example is BowLingual which aimed to translate the sounds of dogs to human language. The BowLingual was named as one of the best inventions of 2002 by Time magazine. See also Yumemi Kobo (dream generator).

Robots
In 2005, Takara produced Walkie bits, a colorful, multi-function miniature robotic turtle. it was named Time magazine's best invention in a robot category.

Company mascot
In the 1980s, the company was criticized for using a mascot that was a golliwog-like character. The mascot was named "Dakko-Chan" (ダッコちゃん). Takara replaced the mascot with "21st Century Colorful Dakko-Chan", which had enough features to connote the original mascot but divested the traits which brought criticism. For example, the new mascot was not always coloured black.

Merger
On 13 May 2005, Takara and Tomy announced their merger. It became effective on 1 March 2006. In English, the official name of the merged company is "TOMY Co. Ltd." while in Japan the legal company name is "K. K. Takara-Tomy".

In deciding upon the merged company's new name, "Takara" was used for its international brand recognition and "Tomy" was used because it was a trusted brand of infant and preschool products in Japan.

While Japanese commercial law allows wide latitude in translating Japanese corporate names into official English names, the merged company took the unusual step of adopting "TOMY Company, Ltd." as its official English, while using "K.K. Takara-Tomy" in Japan.

Both Takara and Tomy held licenses to localise and distribute Hasbro products in Japan. The products include The Game of Life, Blythe dolls, Magic: The Gathering, Duel Masters trading card games by Takara and Monopoly, Furby, Super Soaker and Play-Doh by Tomy.

References

External links 
 TAKARATOMY official website
 TAKARA - Wayback Machine (June 15 archive min, 2005)

 
Japanese companies disestablished in 2006
Toy companies established in 1955
Manufacturing companies disestablished in 2006
2006 mergers and acquisitions
Doll manufacturing companies
Defunct companies of Japan
 
Toy companies of Japan
Japanese companies established in 1955